Marlborough Farms is the first album by the Brooklyn indie pop band The Ladybug Transistor. It was released on October 4, 1996.

The album was named after vocalist/guitarist Gary Olson's home studio.

Critical reception
Douglas Wolk, in Salon, called the album "a competent Pavement rip-off with some curious touches in its arrangements, like singer Gary Olson's trumpet parts."

Track listing
 "Wheel"
 "(Theme To) Lout"
 "Magic Forest Report"
 "Sneedle"
 "Seadrift"
 "Blaze"
 "95 Miles Per Hour"
 "Land"
 "Twice a Lifetime"
 "Song for Vocoder and Trumpet"

References

1996 debut albums
The Ladybug Transistor albums